Isochoric may refer to:

cell-transitive, in geometry
isochoric process, a constant volume process in chemistry or thermodynamics
 Isochoric model